The Bravest Girl of the South is a 1910 American silent film produced by Kalem Company. It was directed by Sidney Olcott with Gene Gauntier in the leading role. It is a story of Civil War.

Production notes
The film was shot in Jacksonville, Florida.

External links
 The Bravest Girl of the South website dedicated to Sidney Olcott

1910 films
Silent American drama films
American silent short films
American Civil War films
Films set in Florida
Films shot in Jacksonville, Florida
Films directed by Sidney Olcott
1910 short films
1910 drama films
American black-and-white films
1910s American films